Kotte Museum is an archaeological Museum in Sri Jayawardenepura Kotte, Sri Lanka. It is located at Bangala junction in Ethul Kotte, on the Borella-Pitakotte main road. The museum serves as the regional museum for Western Province of the country and is maintained by Archaeological department of Sri Lanka.

The museum was first established in 1992 as E. W. Perera Memorial Museum in Ihala Walawwa, the residence of late politician E. W. Perera and was declared open for the public in 1995.

The museum building consists of five exhibition rooms and used to display variety of archaeological antiquities recovered from Kotte and its surrounding area. They include various regional flags, clothing, statues, coins, swords, knives, guns, weapons, pottery, maps and a collection of items used by E. W. Perera and items donated by Douglas Ranasinghe.

See also 
 List of museums in Sri Lanka

References

External links
 Sri Lanka Telecom Pura Varuna - Kotte E W Perera Museum

Museums in Colombo District
Museums established in 1992
1992 establishments in Sri Lanka
Manor houses in Sri Lanka